Schwörstadt station is a railway station in the town of Schwörstadt, Baden-Württemberg, Germany. The station lies on the High Rhine Railway and the train services are operated by Deutsche Bahn.

Services 
 the following services stop at Schwörstadt:

References

External links
 
 

Railway stations in Baden-Württemberg
Buildings and structures in Lörrach (district)